Ticheville is a commune in the Orne department in north-western France.

Ticheville is home to Haras du Mezeray, a Thoroughbred racehorse breeding farm founded by Paul de Moussac in 1962.

See also
Communes of the Orne department

References

Communes of Orne

pms:Tessé-la-Madeleine